The Defense Policy Board Advisory Committee, also referred to as the Defense Policy Board (DPBAC or DPB), is a federal advisory committee to the United States Department of Defense. Their charter is available online through the office of the Director of Administration and Management of the Department of Defense. The committee type is discretionary.

Excerpt of Objectives and Scope of Activities from charter:

1. The Defense Policy Board will serve the public interest by providing the Secretary of Defense, Deputy Secretary of Defense and the Under Secretary of Defense for Policy with independent, informed advice and opinion concerning major matters of defense policy. It will focus upon long-term, enduring issues central to strategic planning for the Department of Defense and will be responsible for research and analysis of topics, long or short range, addressed to it by the Secretary of Defense, Deputy Secretary of Defense and the Under Secretary of Defense for Policy.

Announcements for upcoming meetings of the DPBAC are published in the Federal Register.

History

The board was created under the Reagan Administration. Historically, the DPBAC has mostly served as a method for the Pentagon to leverage consulting expertise in the private sector. However, the DPBAC served a very powerful and influential role in foreign policy in the George W. Bush presidency. 

In the early years of the Bush 43 Administration, Defense Policy Board chairman Richard Perle was an influence in the decision to go to war in Iraq. Later in the administration Jack Keane was instrumental in the implementation of the Iraq War troop surge of 2007.

On 1 July 2009, Secretary of Defense Robert M. Gates announced a new lineup that Matthew B. Stannard said offered a look at Gates' defense priorities.

On 25 November 2020, just before the Thanksgiving weekend, the Trump administration removed at least 11 of 13 board members, including senior defense policy experts such as Henry Kissinger, Madeleine Albright and Jane Harman, leaving Paula Dobriansky and Jim Talent. As of 27 November 2020, replacements have not been named.

In December 2020 Trump administration's Department of Defense announced several replacements to the Defense Policy Board. The included a Hudson Institute analyst Michael Pillsbury as the new board chair, former National Nuclear Security Administration Administrator Lisa Gordon-Hagerty, former House Speaker Newt Gingrich, former Ambassador Thomas Carter, a historian and consultant Edward Luttwak, a retired Air Force Capt. Scott O'Grady, presidential adviser Thomas Stewart, former Rep. Randy Forbes, former Sen. Robert Smith and former Ambassador Charles Glazer. On 19 January 2021, Trump's last full day in office, Kash Patel and Anthony Tata were named to the board as well.

In a 30 January 2021 memo, newly confirmed president Biden's Secretary of Defense Lloyd Austin ordered a "zero-based" review of all the Pentagon advisory boards, and fired all members of the Pentagon advisory boards who are appointed by the DoD effective 16 February 2021. That includes all members of the Defense Police Board.

Current members of the board 

 Herman Bulls
 Ash Carter
 Victor Cha
 Janine Davidson
 Thomas E. Donilon
 Eric S. Edelman
 Michèle Flournoy
 Richard Fontaine
 Nina L. Hachigian
 Jon M. Huntsman, Jr.
 John "Jack" Keane
 Henry A. Kissinger
 Anja Manuel
 Michael O'Hanlon
 BJ Penn
 Kori Schake
 Rajiv J. Shah
 Dana Shell Smith
 H. Patrick Swygert

References

External links 
 Defense Policy Board
 
 definition of DoD federal advisory committee
 Federal Register
 Current members

Policy Board Advisory Committee
American advisory organizations
United States defense policymaking